Stanco is a surname. Notable people with the surname include:

 Francesco Stanco (born 1987), Italian football player
 Michael Stanco (1968–2014), American professional wrestler
 Silvana Stanco (born 1993), Italian sport shooter

See also
 
 Stanko